Pooja Priyanka (born 23 May 1991) is a Fijian-Indian model, actor, dancer, and entrepreneur based in Australia. She holds the Miss World Fiji 2016 Pageant title and debuted in Bollywood by landing a role in a short film, "The Dream Catcher", with Dharmendra.

Career
Priyanka started her career when she was 18 years old by competing for local beauty pageants. She subsequently won many titles due to her strong talent performances in dancing. In 2016, Pooja competed and won the Miss World Fiji title amongst nine other candidates. This victory led her to represent her country at the 66th Miss World Pageant in Washington DC, where she was amongst the top 20 finalists.

Priyanka has been training in Indian traditional dance forms since she was five years old. She is the co-founder and creator of ViDesi Girls, a Bollywood dance company based in Australia. She has her own fashion label ViDesi as well as a co-founder of jewellery brand PaperPeonies. In 2016, it was announced that Pooja Priyanka will be the brand ambassador for Fiji International.

In 2017, Priyanka debuted in Bollywood by landing a role in a short film with Dharmendra for The Dream Catcher. This movie has been nominated for international film festivals around the world.

Pageantry

Miss World Fiji 2016
Priyanka was crowned Miss World Fiji 2016 on 07 May 2016 in the ballroom at the Grand Pacific Hotel in Suva and competed at Miss World 2016 on 18 December 2016 in Washington, D.C., United States.

Miss World 2016
Priyanka represented FIji at Miss World 2016 and placed Top 20 for Talent and Beauty with a purpose.

References

1991 births
Living people
Fijian beauty pageant winners
Fijian Hindus
Miss World 2016 delegates